This is a list of the best-selling singles on the UK Singles Chart for each year. Note that the Number sold section denotes the number sold within the year, not in total, as very often the single continues to sell more in later years (and sometimes other singles released within a particular year will go on to outsell the year-end winner (e.g. Kylie Minogue and Jason Donovan's "Especially for You" (from 1988) ultimately outsold "Mistletoe and Wine")).

The best-selling UK single of all time is "Candle in the Wind 1997/Something About The Way You Look Tonight" by Elton John, which sold 4,770,000 copies.

Best-selling singles by year
 * denotes charity single.

Best-selling singles by decade

See also
 List of best-selling albums by year in the United Kingdom

References
General (list positions)
 

Specific

Notes

Singles by year (UK)